Colonization or settlement of Mars is the theoretical human migration and long-term human establishment of Mars. The prospect has garnered interest from public space agencies and private corporations and has been extensively explored in science fiction writing, film, and art.

Organizations have proposed plans for a human mission to Mars, the first step towards any colonization effort, but no person has set foot on the planet, and there have been no return missions. However, landers and rovers have successfully explored the planetary surface and delivered information about conditions on the ground.

Mars' orbit is close to Earth's orbit and the asteroid belt. While Mars' day and general composition are similar to Earth, the planet is hostile to life. The barren landscape on Mars is covered by fine dust and intense ionizing radiation. Mars has in-situ resources, such as underground water, Martian soil, and ore, which could be leveraged by colonists. Opportunities to generate electricity via wind, solar, and nuclear power using resources on Mars are poor.

Justifications and motivations for colonizing Mars include curiosity, the potential for humans to provide more in-depth observational research than uncrewed rovers, an economic interest in its resources, and the possibility that the settlement of other planets could decrease the likelihood of human extinction. Difficulties and hazards include radiation exposure during a trip to Mars and on its surface, toxic soil, low gravity, the isolation that accompanies Mars' distance from Earth, a lack of water, and cold temperatures.

Commitments to researching permanent settlement have been made by public space agencies—NASA, ESA, Roscosmos, ISRO, the CNSA, among others—and private organizations—SpaceX, Lockheed Martin, and Boeing.

Mission concepts and timelines
Since the 20th century, there have been several proposed human missions to Mars both by government agencies and private companies.

Most of the human mission concepts as currently conceived by national governmental space programs would not be direct precursors to colonization. Programs such as those being tentatively planned by NASA, Roscosmos, and ESA are intended solely as exploration missions, with the establishment of a permanent base possible but not yet the main goal. 

Colonization requires the establishment of permanent habitats that have the potential for self-expansion and self-sustenance. Two early proposals for building habitats on Mars are the Mars Direct and the Semi-Direct concepts, advocated by Robert Zubrin, an advocate of the colonization of Mars.

At the February 2017 World Government Summit, the United Arab Emirates announced a plan to establish a settlement on Mars by 2117, led by the Mohammed bin Rashid Space Centre.

SpaceX has proposed the development of Mars transportation infrastructure in order to facilitate the eventual colonization of Mars. The mission architecture includes fully reusable launch vehicles, human-rated spacecraft, on-orbit propellant tankers, rapid-turnaround launch/landing mounts, and local production of rocket fuel on Mars via in situ resource utilization (ISRU). SpaceX's aspirational goal  was to land their cargo Starships on Mars by 2024 and the first 2 crewed starships by 2026.

Comparisons between Earth and Mars

Gravity and size

The surface gravity of Mars is just 38% that of Earth. Although microgravity is known to cause health problems such as muscle loss and bone demineralization, it is not known if Martian gravity would have a similar effect. The Mars Gravity Biosatellite was a proposed project designed to learn more about what effect Mars' lower surface gravity would have on humans, but it was cancelled due to a lack of funding.

Mars has a surface area that is 28.4% of Earth's, which is only slightly less than the amount of dry land on Earth (which is 29.2% of Earth's surface). Mars has half the radius of Earth and only one-tenth the mass. This means that it has a smaller volume (≈15%) and lower average density than Earth.

Magnetosphere

Due to the lack of a magnetosphere, solar particle events and cosmic rays can easily reach the Martian surface.

Atmosphere
Atmospheric pressure on Mars is far below the Armstrong limit at which people can survive without pressure suits. Since terraforming cannot be expected as a near-term solution, habitable structures on Mars would need to be constructed with pressure vessels similar to spacecraft, capable of containing a pressure between 30 and 100 kPa. The atmosphere is also toxic as most of it consists of carbon dioxide (95% carbon dioxide, 3% nitrogen, 1.6% argon, and traces totaling less than 0.4% of other gases, including oxygen).

This thin atmosphere does not filter out ultraviolet sunlight, which causes instability in the molecular bonds between atoms. For example, ammonia (NH3) is not stable in the Martian atmosphere and breaks down after a few hours.
Also due to the thinness of the atmosphere, the temperature difference between day and night is much larger than on Earth, typically around 70 °C (125 °F). However, the day/night temperature variation is much lower during dust storms when very little light gets through to the surface even during the day, and instead warms the middle atmosphere.

Water and climate
Water on Mars is scarce, with rovers Spirit and Opportunity finding less than there is in Earth's driest desert.

The lowest temperature ever recorded on Earth was 184 K (−89.2 °C, −128.6 °F) in Antarctica.

Because Mars is about 52% farther from the Sun, the amount of solar energy entering its upper atmosphere per unit area (the solar constant) is only around 43.3% of what reaches the Earth's upper atmosphere. However, due to the much thinner atmosphere, a higher fraction of the solar energy reaches the surface as radiation. The maximum solar irradiance on Mars is about 590 W/m2 compared to about 1000 W/m2 at the Earth's surface; optimal conditions on the Martian equator can be compared to those on Devon Island in the Canadian Arctic in June. Mars' orbit is more eccentric than Earth's, increasing temperature and solar constant variations over the course of the Martian year. Mars has no rain and virtually no clouds, so although cold, it is permanently sunny (apart from during dust storms). This means solar panels can always operate at maximum efficiency on dust-free days.

Global dust storms are common throughout the year and can cover the entire planet for weeks, blocking sunlight from reaching the surface. This has been observed to cause temperature drops of 4 °C (7 °F) for several months after the storm. In contrast, the only comparable events on Earth are infrequent large volcanic eruptions such as the Krakatoa event which threw large amounts of ash into the atmosphere in 1883, causing a global temperature drop of around 1 °C (2 °F).
These dust storms would affect electricity production from solar panels for long periods, and interfere with communications with Earth.

Temperature and seasons
Mars has an axial tilt of 25.19°, similar to Earth's 23.44°. As a result, Mars has seasons much like Earth, though on average they last nearly twice as long because the Martian year is about 1.88 Earth years. Mars' temperature regime is more similar to Earth's than all other planets‘ in the solar system. While generally colder than Earth, Mars can have Earth-like temperatures in some areas and at certain times.

Soil
The Martian soil is toxic due to relatively high concentrations of chlorine and associated compounds, such as perchlorates, which are hazardous to all known forms of life, even though some halotolerant microorganisms might be able to cope with enhanced perchlorate concentrations by drawing on physiological adaptations similar to those observed in the yeast Debaryomyces hansenii exposed in lab experiments to increasing NaClO4 concentrations.

Survivability
Plants and animals cannot survive the ambient conditions on the surface of Mars. However, some extremophile organisms that survive in hostile conditions on Earth have endured periods of exposure to environments that approximate some of the conditions found on Mars.

Length of day
The Martian day (or sol) is very close in duration to Earth's. A solar day on Mars is 24 hours, 39 minutes and 35.244 seconds.

Conditions for human habitation

Conditions on the surface of Mars are closer to the conditions on Earth in terms of temperature and sunlight than on any other planet or moon, except for the cloud tops of Venus. However, the surface is not hospitable to humans or most known life forms due to the radiation, greatly reduced air pressure, and an atmosphere with only 0.16% oxygen.

In 2012, it was reported that some lichen and cyanobacteria survived and showed remarkable adaptation capacity for photosynthesis after 34 days in simulated Martian conditions in the Mars Simulation Laboratory (MSL) maintained by the German Aerospace Center (DLR). Some scientists think that cyanobacteria could play a role in the development of self-sustainable crewed outposts on Mars. They propose that cyanobacteria could be used directly for various applications, including the production of food, fuel and oxygen, but also indirectly: products from their culture could support the growth of other organisms, opening the way to a wide range of life-support biological processes based on Martian resources.

Humans have explored parts of Earth that match some conditions on Mars. Based on NASA rover data, temperatures on Mars (at low latitudes) are similar to those in Antarctica. The atmospheric pressure at the highest altitudes reached by piloted balloon ascents (35 km (114,000 feet) in 1961, 38 km in 2012) is similar to that on the surface of Mars. However, the pilots were not exposed to the extremely low pressure, as it would have killed them, but seated in a pressurized capsule.

Human survival on Mars would require living in artificial Mars habitats with complex life-support systems. One key aspect of this would be water processing systems. Being made mainly of water, a human being would die in a matter of days without it. Even a 5–8% decrease in total body water causes fatigue and dizziness and a 10% decrease physical and mental impairment (See Dehydration). A person in the UK uses 70–140 litres of water per day on average. Through experience and training, astronauts on the ISS have shown it is possible to use far less, and that around 70% of what is used can be recycled using the ISS water recovery systems. (For instance, half of all water is used during showers.) Similar systems would be needed on Mars but would need to be much more efficient, since regular robotic deliveries of water to Mars would be prohibitively expensive (the ISS is supplied with water four times per year). Potential access to on-site water (frozen or otherwise) via drilling has been investigated by NASA.

Effects on human health 

Mars presents a hostile environment for human habitation. Different technologies have been developed to assist long-term space exploration and may be adapted for habitation on Mars. The existing record for the longest consecutive space flight is 438 days by cosmonaut Valeri Polyakov, and the most accrued time in space is 878 days by Gennady Padalka. The longest time spent outside the protection of the Earth's Van Allen radiation belt is about 12 days for the Apollo 17 moon landing. This is minor in comparison to the 1100-day journey to Mars and back envisioned by NASA for possibly as early as the year 2028. Scientists have also hypothesized that many different biological functions can be negatively affected by the environment of Mars colonies. Due to higher levels of radiation, there are a multitude of physical side-effects that must be mitigated. In addition, Martian soil contains high levels of toxins which are hazardous to human health.

Physical effects 
The difference in gravity may negatively affect human health by weakening bones and muscles. There is also risk of osteoporosis and cardiovascular problems. Current rotations on the International Space Station put astronauts in zero gravity for six months, a comparable length of time to a one-way trip to Mars. This gives researchers the ability to better understand the physical state that astronauts going to Mars would arrive in. Once on Mars, surface gravity is only 38% of that on Earth. Microgravity affects the cardiovascular, musculoskeletal and neurovestibular (central nervous) systems. The cardiovascular effects are complex. On Earth, blood within the body stays 70% below the heart, but in microgravity this is not the case due to nothing pulling the blood down. This can have several negative effects. Once entering into microgravity, the blood pressure in the lower body and legs is significantly reduced. This causes legs to become weak through loss of muscle and bone mass. Astronauts show signs of a puffy face and chicken legs syndrome. After the first day of reentry back to earth, blood samples showed a 17% loss of blood plasma, which contributed to a decline of erythropoietin secretion. On the skeletal system which is important to support our body's posture, long space flight and exposure to microgravity cause demineralization and atrophy of muscles. During re-acclimation, astronauts were observed to have a myriad of symptoms including cold sweats, nausea, vomiting and motion sickness. Returning astronauts also felt disoriented. Journeys to and from Mars being six months is the average time spent at the ISS. Once on Mars with its lesser surface gravity (38% percent of Earth's), these health effects would be a serious concern. Upon return to Earth, recovery from bone loss and atrophy is a long process and the effects of microgravity may never fully reverse.

Radiation
Dangerous amounts of radiation reach Mars' surface despite it being much further from the Sun compared to Earth. Mars has lost its inner dynamo giving it a weaker global magnetosphere than Earth does. Combined with a thin atmosphere, this permits a significant amount of ionizing radiation to reach the Martian surface. 
There are two main types of radiation risks to traveling outside the protection of Earth's atmosphere and magnetosphere: galactic cosmic rays (GCR) and solar energetic particles (SEP). Earth's magnetosphere protects from charged particles from the Sun, and the atmosphere protects against uncharged and highly energetic GCRs. There are ways to mitigate solar radiation, but without much of an atmosphere, the only solution to the GCR flux is heavy shielding amounting to roughly 15 centimeters of steel, 1 meter of rock, or 3 meters of water, limiting human colonists to living underground most of the time.

The Mars Odyssey spacecraft carries an instrument, the Mars Radiation Environment Experiment (MARIE), to measure the radiation. MARIE found that radiation levels in orbit above Mars are 2.5 times higher than at the International Space Station. The average daily dose was about —equivalent to 0.08 Gy per year. A three-year exposure to such levels would exceed the safety limits currently adopted by NASA, and the risk of developing cancer due to radiation exposure after a Mars mission could be two times greater than what scientists previously thought. Occasional solar proton events (SPEs) produce much higher doses, as observed in September 2017, when NASA reported radiation levels on the surface of Mars were temporarily doubled, and were associated with an aurora 25-times brighter than any observed earlier, due to a massive, and unexpected, solar storm. Building living quarters underground (possibly in Martian lava tubes) would significantly lower the colonists' exposure to radiation.

Much remains to be learned about space radiation. In 2003, NASA's Lyndon B. Johnson Space Center opened a facility, the NASA Space Radiation Laboratory, at Brookhaven National Laboratory, that employs particle accelerators to simulate space radiation. The facility studies its effects on living organisms, as well as experimenting with shielding techniques. Initially, there was some evidence that this kind of low level, chronic radiation is not quite as dangerous as once thought; and that radiation hormesis occurs. However, results from a 2006 study indicated that protons from cosmic radiation may cause twice as much serious damage to DNA as previously estimated, exposing astronauts to greater risk of cancer and other diseases. As a result of the higher radiation in the Martian environment, the summary report of the Review of U.S. Human Space Flight Plans Committee released in 2009 reported that "Mars is not an easy place to visit with existing technology and without a substantial investment of resources." NASA is exploring a variety of alternative techniques and technologies such as deflector shields of plasma to protect astronauts and spacecraft from radiation.

Psychological effects 
Due to the communication delays, new protocols need to be developed in order to assess crew members' psychological health. Researchers have developed a Martian simulation called HI-SEAS (Hawaii Space Exploration Analog and Simulation) that places scientists in a simulated Martian laboratory to study the psychological effects of isolation, repetitive tasks, and living in close-quarters with other scientists for up to a year at a time. Computer programs are being developed to assist crews with personal and interpersonal issues in absence of direct communication with professionals on Earth.

Terraforming

Various works of fiction put forward the idea of terraforming Mars to allow a wide variety of life forms, including humans, to survive unaided on Mars' surface. Some ideas of possible technologies that may be able to contribute to the terraforming of Mars have been conjectured, but none would be able to bring the entire planet into the Earth-like habitat pictured in science fiction.

Minimum size of a colony

To be self-sustaining, a colony would have to be large enough to provide all the necessary living services. These include 
 Ecosystem management: producing appropriate gases, controlling air composition pressure and temperature, collecting and producing water, growing food and processing organic wastes.
 Energy production: this includes extracting methane for vehicles and if photovoltaic cells are used to produce energy this would include the extraction and processing of silicates, to augment or replace any original equipment.
 Industry: extracting and processing appropriate ores, manufacturing tools and other objects; producing clothes, medicine, glass, ceramics, plastics.
 Building: even if the base is constructed before arrival, it will need frequent adaptation according to the evolution of the settlement as well as inevitable replacement.
 Social activities: this includes raising children and educating them, health care, preparing meals, cleaning, washing, organizing the work and making decisions. Time for sport, culture and entertainment can be minimized but not eliminated.

As the number of individuals grows, both activities and objects can be shared between them. Growth also will offset the risks of collapse of the society, caused by sudden deaths, accidents, infertility or inbreeding. But this may not prevent mortal combat between different groups of individuals, or the loss of efficiency due to inappropriate social organization.

By mathematical modelling of the time spent by people on these issues and by keeping things simple, Salotti concludes that the minimum number for a colony on Mars is 110.  This is close to other studies of the genetic problems involved in the longer journey to Proxima Centauri b (6,000+ years).

Transportation

Interplanetary spaceflight

Mars requires less energy per unit mass (delta V) to reach from Earth than any planet except Venus. Using a Hohmann transfer orbit, a trip to Mars requires approximately nine months in space. Modified transfer trajectories that cut the travel time down to four to seven months in space are possible with incrementally higher amounts of energy and fuel compared to a Hohmann transfer orbit, and are in standard use for robotic Mars missions. Shortening the travel time below about six months requires higher delta-v and an increasing amount of fuel, and is difficult with chemical rockets. It could be feasible with advanced spacecraft propulsion technologies, some of which have already been tested to varying levels, such as Variable Specific Impulse Magnetoplasma Rocket, and nuclear rockets. In the former case, a trip time of forty days could be attainable, and in the latter, a trip time down to about two weeks. In 2016, a University of California, Santa Barbara scientist said they could further reduce travel time for a small robotic probe to Mars down to "as little as 72 hours" with the use of a laser propelled sail (directed photonic propulsion) system instead of the fuel-based rocket propulsion system.

During the journey the astronauts would be subject to radiation, which would require a means to protect them. Cosmic radiation and solar wind cause DNA damage, which increases the risk of cancer significantly. The effect of long-term travel in interplanetary space is unknown, but scientists estimate an added risk of between 1% and 19% (one estimate is 3.4%) for males to die of cancer because of the radiation during the journey to Mars and back to Earth. For females the probability is higher due to generally larger glandular tissues.

Landing on Mars

Mars has a surface gravity 0.38 times that of Earth, and the density of its atmosphere is about 0.6% of that on Earth. The relatively strong gravity and the presence of aerodynamic effects make it difficult to land heavy, crewed spacecraft with thrusters only, as was done with the Apollo Moon landings, yet the atmosphere is too thin for aerodynamic effects to be of much help in aerobraking and landing a large vehicle. Landing piloted missions on Mars would require braking and landing systems different from anything used to land crewed spacecraft on the Moon or robotic missions on Mars.

If one assumes carbon nanotube construction material will be available with a strength of  then a space elevator could be built to land people and material on Mars.
A space elevator on Phobos (a Martian moon) has also been proposed.

Phobos as a space elevator for Mars

Phobos is synchronously orbiting Mars, where the same face stays facing the planet at ~6,028 km above the Martian surface.  A space elevator could extend down from Phobos to Mars 6,000 km, about 28 kilometers from the surface, and just out of the atmosphere of Mars. A similar space elevator cable could extend out 6,000 km the opposite direction that would counterbalance Phobos.  In total the space elevator would extend out over 12,000 km which would be below Areostationary orbit of Mars (17,032 km). A rocket launch would still be needed to get the rocket and cargo to the beginning of the space elevator 28 km above the surface.  The surface of Mars is rotating at 0.25 km/s at the equator and the bottom of the space elevator would be rotating around Mars at 0.77 km/s, so only 0.52 km/s of Delta-v would be needed to get to the space elevator. Phobos orbits at 2.15 km/s and the outer most part of the space elevator would rotate around Mars at 3.52 km/s.

Equipment needed for colonization
Colonization of Mars would require a wide variety of equipment—both equipment to directly provide services to humans and production equipment used to produce food, propellant, water, energy and breathable oxygen—in order to support human colonization efforts. Required equipment will include:
Basic utilities (oxygen, power, local communications, waste disposal, sanitation and water recycling)
Habitats
Storage facilities
Workspaces
Airlock, for pressurization and dust management
Resource extraction equipment—initially for water and oxygen, later for a wider cross section of minerals, building materials, etc.
Equipment for energy production and energy storage, some solar and perhaps nuclear as well

Food production spaces and equipment.
Propellant production equipment, generally thought to be hydrogen and methane through the Sabatier reaction for fuel—with oxygen oxidizer—for chemical rocket engines
Fuels or other energy source for use with surface transportation. Carbon monoxide/oxygen (CO/O2) engines have been suggested for early surface transportation use as both carbon monoxide and oxygen can be straightforwardly produced by zirconium dioxide electrolysis from the Martian atmosphere without requiring use of any of the Martian water resources to obtain hydrogen.
Off-planet communication equipment
Equipment for moving over the surface—Mars suit, crewed rovers and possibly even Mars aircraft.

Basic utilities 
In order to function at all the colony would need the basic utilities to support human civilization. These would need to be designed to handle the harsh Martian environment and would either have to be serviceable while wearing an EVA suit or housed inside a human habitable environment. For example, if electricity generation systems rely on solar power, large energy storage facilities will also be needed to cover the periods when dust storms block out the sun, and automatic dust removal systems may be needed to avoid human exposure to conditions on the surface. If the colony is to scale beyond a few people, systems will also need to maximise use of local resources to reduce the need for resupply from Earth, for example by recycling water and oxygen and being adapted to be able to use any water found on Mars, whatever form it is in.

Communication with Earth
Communications with Earth are relatively straightforward during the half-sol when Earth is above the Martian horizon. NASA and ESA included communications relay equipment in several of the Mars orbiters, so Mars already has communications satellites. While these will eventually wear out, additional orbiters with communication relay capability are likely to be launched before any colonization expeditions are mounted.

The one-way communication delay due to the speed of light ranges from about 3 minutes at closest approach (approximated by perihelion of Mars minus aphelion of Earth) to 22 minutes at the largest possible superior conjunction (approximated by aphelion of Mars plus aphelion of Earth). Real-time communication, such as telephone conversations or Internet Relay Chat, between Earth and Mars would be highly impractical due to the long time lags involved. NASA has found that direct communication can be blocked for about two weeks every synodic period, around the time of superior conjunction when the Sun is directly between Mars and Earth, although the actual duration of the communications blackout varies from mission to mission depending on various factors—such as the amount of link margin designed into the communications system, and the minimum data rate that is acceptable from a mission standpoint. In reality most missions at Mars have had communications blackout periods of the order of a month.

However, the size and power of the equipment needed for these distances make the L4 and L5 locations unrealistic for relay stations, and the inherent stability of these regions, although beneficial in terms of station-keeping, also attracts dust and asteroids, which could pose a risk. Despite that concern, the STEREO probes passed through the L4 and L5 regions without damage in late 2009.

Recent work by the University of Strathclyde's Advanced Space Concepts Laboratory, in collaboration with the European Space Agency, has suggested an alternative relay architecture based on highly non-Keplerian orbits. These are a special kind of orbit produced when continuous low-thrust propulsion, such as that produced from an ion engine or solar sail, modifies the natural trajectory of a spacecraft. Such an orbit would enable continuous communications during solar conjunction by allowing a relay spacecraft to "hover" above Mars, out of the orbital plane of the two planets. Such a relay avoids the problems of satellites stationed at either L4 or L5 by being significantly closer to the surface of Mars while still maintaining continuous communication between the two planets.

Robotic precursors

The path to a human colony could be prepared by robotic systems such as the Mars Exploration Rovers Spirit, Opportunity, Curiosity and Perseverance. These systems could help locate resources, such as ground water or ice, that would help a colony grow and thrive. The lifetimes of these systems would be years and even decades, and as recent developments in commercial spaceflight have shown, it may be that these systems will involve private as well as government ownership. These robotic systems also have a reduced cost compared with early crewed operations, and have less political risk.

Wired systems might lay the groundwork for early crewed landings and bases, by producing various consumables including fuel, oxidizers, water, and construction materials. Establishing power, communications, shelter, heating, and manufacturing basics can begin with robotic systems, if only as a prelude to crewed operations.

Mars Surveyor 2001 Lander MIP (Mars ISPP Precursor) was to demonstrate manufacture of oxygen from the atmosphere of Mars, and test solar cell technologies and methods of mitigating the effect of Martian dust on the power systems.

Before any people are transported to Mars on the notional 2020s Mars transportation infrastructure envisioned by SpaceX, a number of robotic cargo missions would be undertaken first in order to transport the requisite equipment, habitats and supplies.
Equipment that would be necessary would include "machines to produce fertilizer, methane and oxygen from Mars' atmospheric nitrogen and carbon dioxide and the planet's subsurface water ice" as well as construction materials to build transparent domes for initial agricultural areas.

Economics

As with early colonies in the New World, economics would be a crucial aspect to a colony's success. The reduced gravity well of Mars and its position in the Solar System may facilitate Mars–Earth trade and may provide an economic rationale for continued settlement of the planet. Given its size and resources, this might eventually be a place to grow food and produce equipment to mine the asteroid belt.

Some early Mars colonies might specialize in developing local resources for Martian consumption, such as water and/or ice. Local resources can also be used in infrastructure construction. One source of Martian ore currently known to be available is metallic iron in the form of nickel–iron meteorites. Iron in this form is more easily extracted than from the iron oxides that cover the planet.

Another main inter-Martian trade good during early colonization could be manure. Assuming that life doesn't exist on Mars, the soil is going to be very poor for growing plants, so manure and other fertilizers will be valued highly in any Martian civilization until the planet changes enough chemically to support growing vegetation on its own.

Solar power is a candidate for power for a Martian colony. Solar insolation (the amount of solar radiation that reaches Mars) is about 42% of that on Earth, since Mars is about 52% farther from the Sun and insolation falls off as the square of distance. But the thin atmosphere would allow almost all of that energy to reach the surface as compared to Earth, where the atmosphere absorbs roughly a quarter of the solar radiation. Sunlight on the surface of Mars would be much like a moderately cloudy day on Earth.

Economic drivers
Space colonization on Mars can roughly be said to be possible when the necessary methods of space colonization become cheap enough (such as space access by cheaper launch systems) to meet the cumulative funds that have been gathered for the purpose.

Although there are no immediate prospects for the large amounts of money required for any space colonization to be available given traditional launch costs, there is some prospect of a radical reduction to launch costs in the 2020s, which would consequently lessen the cost of any efforts in that direction. SpaceX's reusable plans include Falcon Heavy and future methane-based launch vehicles including the Starship. If SpaceX is successful in developing the reusable technology, it would be expected to "have a major impact on the cost of access to space", and change the increasingly competitive market in space launch services.

Alternative funding approaches might include the creation of inducement prizes. For example, the 2004 President's Commission on Implementation of United States Space Exploration Policy suggested that an inducement prize contest should be established, perhaps by government, for the achievement of space colonization. One example provided was offering a prize to the first organization to place humans on the Moon and sustain them for a fixed period before they return to Earth.

Mining the asteroid belts from Mars

Since Mars is much closer to the asteroid belt than Earth is, it would take less Delta-v to get to the Asteroid belt and return minerals to Mars.  One hypothesis is that the Moons of Mars (Phobos and Deimos) are actually Asteroid captures from the Asteroid belt. 16 Psyche in the main belt could have over $10,000 Quadrillion Dollars worth of minerals.  NASA is planning a mission for October 10, 2023 for the Psyche orbiter to launch and get to the asteroid by August 2029 to study. 511 Davida could have $27 quadrillion Dollars worth of minerals and resources. Using the moon Phobos to launch spacecraft is energetically favorable and a useful location from which to dispatch missions to main belt asteroids. Mining the asteroid belt from Mars and its moons could help in the colonization of Mars.

Possible locations for settlements

Poles 
It has been proposed to set up a first base at a Martian pole, which would allow access to water.

Caves 

Caves would naturally provide a degree of insulation from Martian hazards for humans on the planet. These hazards include radiation, impactor events, and the wide range in temperatures on the surface.

Mars Odyssey found what appear to be natural caves near the volcano Arsia Mons. It has been speculated that settlers could benefit from the shelter that these or similar structures could provide from radiation and micrometeoroids. Geothermal energy is also suspected in the equatorial regions.

A team of researchers which presented at Geological Society of America Connects 2022 identified some 139 caves worth exploring as potential shelters. Each was within  of a location ideal for use as a landing site and had been imaged in high-resolution by HiRISE.

Lava tubes 
Several possible Martian lava tube skylights have been located on the flanks of Arsia Mons. Earth based examples indicate that some should have lengthy passages offering complete protection from radiation and be relatively easy to seal using on-site materials, especially in small subsections.

Hellas Planitia 
Hellas Planitia is the lowest lying plain below the Martian geodetic datum. The atmospheric pressure is relatively higher in this place when compared to the rest of Mars.

Planetary protection

Robotic spacecraft to Mars are required to be sterilized, to have at most 300,000 spores on the exterior of the craft—and more thoroughly sterilized if they contact "special regions" containing water, otherwise there is a risk of contaminating not only the life-detection experiments but possibly the planet itself.

It is impossible to sterilize human missions to this level, as humans are host to typically a hundred trillion microorganisms of thousands of species of the human microbiome, and these cannot be removed while preserving the life of the human. Containment seems the only option, but it is a major challenge in the event of a hard landing (i.e. crash). There have been several planetary workshops on this issue, but with no final guidelines for a way forward yet. Human explorers would also be vulnerable to back contamination to Earth if they become carriers of microorganisms should Mars have life.

Ethical, political and legal challenges 
It is unforeseen how the first human landing on Mars will change the current policies regarding the exploration of space and occupancy of celestial bodies. In the 1967 United Nations Outer Space Treaty, it was determined that no country may take claim to space or its inhabitants. Since the planet Mars offers a challenging environment and dangerous obstacles for humans to overcome, the laws and culture on the planet will most likely be very different from those on Earth. With Elon Musk announcing his plans for travel to Mars, it is uncertain how the dynamic of a private company possibly being the first to put a human on Mars will play out on a national and global scale. NASA had to deal with several cuts in funding. During the presidency of Barack Obama, the objective for NASA to reach Mars was pushed to the background. In 2017, president Donald Trump promised to return humans to the Moon and eventually Mars, and increased the NASA budget by $1.1 billion, to mostly focus on development of the new Space Launch System.

Colonialism

Space colonization in general has been discussed as continuation of imperialism and colonialism, especially regarding Mars colonial decision making and reasons for colonial labor and land exploitation have been questioned with postcolonial critique. Seeing the need for inclusive and democratic participation and implementation of any space and Mars exploration, infrastructure, or colonialization, many have called for dramatic sociological reforms and guarantees to prevent racism, sexism, and other forms of prejudice.

The narrative of space exploration as a "New Frontier" has been criticized as unreflected continuation of settler colonialism and manifest destiny, continuing the narrative of colonial exploration as fundamental to the assumed human nature.

The predominant perspective of territorial colonization in space has been called surfacism, especially comparing advocacy for colonization of Mars opposed to Venus.

Dangers to pregnancy
One possible ethical challenge that space travelers might face is that of pregnancy during the trip. According to NASA's policies, it is forbidden for members of the crew to engage in sex in space. NASA wants its crew members to treat each other like coworkers would in a professional environment. A pregnant member on a spacecraft is dangerous to all those aboard. The pregnant woman and child would need additional nutrition from the rations aboard, as well as special treatment and care. The pregnancy would impinge on the pregnant crew member's duties and abilities. It is still not fully known how the environment in a spacecraft would affect the development of a child aboard. It is known however that a fetus would be more susceptible to solar radiation in space, which would likely have a negative effect on its cells and genetics. During a long trip to Mars, it is likely that members of craft may engage in sex due to their stressful and isolated environment.

Advocacy

Mars colonization is advocated by several non-governmental groups for a range of reasons and with varied proposals. One of the oldest groups is the Mars Society who promote a NASA program to accomplish human exploration of Mars and have set up Mars analog research stations in Canada and the United States. Mars to Stay advocates recycling emergency return vehicles into permanent settlements as soon as initial explorers determine permanent habitation is possible.

Elon Musk founded SpaceX with the long-term goal of developing the technologies that will enable a self-sustaining human colony on Mars. Richard Branson, in his lifetime, is "determined to be a part of starting a population on Mars. I think it is absolutely realistic. It will happen... I think over the next 20 years," [from 2012] "we will take literally hundreds of thousands of people to space and that will give us the financial resources to do even bigger things".

Author Robert Zubrin has been a major advocate for Mars exploration and colonization for many years. He is a member of the Mars society and has authored several fiction and nonfiction books about the subject. In 1996 he wrote The Case for Mars: The Plan to Settle the Red Planet and Why We Must. He continues to advocate for Mars and space exploration with his most recent book being The Case for Space: How the Revolution in Spaceflight Opens Up a Future of Limitless Possibility.

In June 2013, Buzz Aldrin, American engineer and former astronaut, and the second person to walk on the Moon, wrote an opinion, published in The New York Times, supporting a human mission to Mars and viewing the Moon "not as a destination but more a point of departure, one that places humankind on a trajectory to homestead Mars and become a two-planet species". In August 2015, Aldrin, in association with the Florida Institute of Technology, presented a "master plan", for NASA consideration, for astronauts, with a "tour of duty of ten years", to colonize Mars before the year 2040.

In fiction

A few instances in fiction provide detailed descriptions of Mars colonization. They include:

 Terra Formars (2011)
 Away (2020), published by Netflix
 Surviving Mars (2018), developed by Haemimont Games, published by Paradox Interactive
 The Expanse (2016-2021) airing originally on Syfy, then Amazon Prime
 TerraGenesis (2016) developed by Edgeworks Entertainment, published by Tilting Point
 Colony One Mars: A SciFi Thriller (2016), by Gerald Kilby 
 The Space Between Us (2016 film), by Peter Chelsom
 Mars (2016) by National Geographic
 John Carter (2012), by Mark Andrews
 The Martian (2011), by Andy Weir (and the 2015 film, directed by Ridley Scott)
 Mr. Nobody (2009), by Jaco Van Dormael
 Tom and Jerry: Blast Off to Mars (2005) animated science fiction comedy film by Warner Bros. Animation and Turner Entertainment
 Aria (2002–2008), by Kozue Amano
 First Landing (2002), by Robert Zubrin
 Red Faction (2001), developed by Volition, published by THQ

 Mars Diaries (2000), by Sigmund Brouwer
 Martian Gothic: Unification (2000), developed by Creative Reality for Microsoft Windows and Coyote Developments for PlayStation, published by TalonSoft for Microsoft Windows and Take-Two Interactive for PlayStation
 Mars Underground (1997), by William K. Hartmann
 Climbing Olympus (1994), by Kevin J. Anderson

 The Martian (1992) and Return to Mars (1999), by Ben Bova
 Total Recall (1990), by Paul Verhoeven
 Icehenge (1985), the Mars trilogy (Red Mars, Green Mars, Blue Mars, 1992–1996), and The Martians (1999), by Kim Stanley Robinson
 Man Plus (1976), by Frederik Pohl
 The Destruction of Faena (1974), by Alexander Kazantsev
 We Can Remember It for You Wholesale (1966), by Philip K. Dick
 The Sands of Mars (1951), by Arthur C. Clarke
 The Martian Chronicles (1950), by Ray Bradbury
 Red Planet (1949), by Robert A. Heinlein

Interactive Mars map

See also

 
 
 
 
 
 
 
 
 
 
 
 
 
 
 
 List of crewed Mars mission plans
 
 
 
 Mars Outpost

References

Further reading
  (at BuzzAldrin.com)
 Robert Zubrin, The Case for Mars: The Plan to Settle the Red Planet and Why We Must, Simon & Schuster/Touchstone, 1996, 
 Frank Crossman and Robert Zubrin, editors, On to Mars: Colonizing a New World. Apogee Books Space Series, 2002, .
 Frank Crossman and Robert Zubrin, editors, On to Mars 2: Exploring and Settling a New World. Apogee Books Space Series, 2005, .
 Resource Utilization Concepts for MoonMars; By Iris Fleischer, Olivia Haider, Morten W. Hansen, Robert Peckyno, Daniel Rosenberg and Robert E. Guinness; 30 September 2003; IAC Bremen, 2003 (29 Sept–03 Oct 2003) and MoonMars Workshop (26–28 Sept 2003, Bremen). Accessed on 18 January 2010
 MARTIAN OUTPOST: The Challenges of Establishing a Human Settlement on Mars ; by Erik Seedhouse; Praxis Publishing; 2009; . Also see , 
 Ice, mineral-rich soil could support human outpost on Mars; by Sharon Gaudin; 27 June 2008; IDG News Service

External links

 Mars Society
 The Planetary Society: Mars Millennium Project
 4Frontiers Corporation
 The Mars Foundation
 Making Mars the New Earth – National Geographic
 Should we colonize Mars? – Wikidebate in Wikiversity

 
Exploration of Mars
Human missions to Mars
Mars
Mars Society